Ursula Seitz (born 10 April 1948) is an Austrian former swimmer. She competed in the women's 100 metre backstroke at the 1964 Summer Olympics held in Tokyo, Japan.

References

External links
 

1948 births
Living people
Olympic swimmers of Austria
Swimmers at the 1964 Summer Olympics
Place of birth missing (living people)
Austrian female backstroke swimmers